James E. Breuer (born June 21, 1967) is an American stand-up comedian and actor. He was a cast member on Saturday Night Live from 1995 to 1998 and starred in the film Half Baked (1998).

Early life
Breuer was born in Valley Stream, New York on Long Island.

His first job was at Sears when he was a teenager.

Career

Television career
Breuer was a member of the cast of Saturday Night Live from 1995 to 1998, playing characters such as Joe Pesci and Goat Boy. He went on to host The Jim Breuer Show after leaving SNL. Breuer later hosted the third season of the VH1 show Web Junk 20, has done two Comedy Central specials—2002's Hardcore, and 2009's Let's Clear the Air—and has been featured in commercials for Pizza Hut.

Radio career
Breuer was a regular on The Howard Stern Show, Opie and Anthony Show and is the host of Fridays with Jim Breuer, on Sirius Satellite Radio.

Other work
Breuer regularly tours as a comedian. Footage of his 2008 tour was used in his documentary More Than Me and in his 4-hour DVD program The Jim Breuer Road Journals.

Breuer has written one book: I'm Not High (But I've Got a Lot of Crazy Stories about Life as a Goat Boy, a Dad, and a Spiritual Warrior).

In January 2011, he launched a podcast called "The Podcast Masters" with fellow comedian Pete Correale.

In September 2021, Breuer cancelled shows at venues requiring COVID-19 vaccination in New Jersey and Michigan and has stated that he will not perform at venues with such requirements.

Personal life
From 2005 to 2021, Breuer lived in Chester Township, New Jersey, with his wife, Dee, and three daughters. In August 2021, Breuer and his family moved to Naples, Florida after selling their home in New Jersey.

He describes himself as a "superfan" of the New York Mets.

Discography
 Jim Breuer and the Loud & Rowdy – Songs from the Garage (2016; Metal Blade Records)

Filmography

References

External links
 
 

1967 births
Living people
People from Chester Township, New Jersey
People from Valley Stream, New York
Male actors from New York (state)
American male film actors
American stand-up comedians
American talk radio hosts
American male television actors
Valley Stream Central High School alumni
American sketch comedians
American male comedians
Comedians from New York (state)
20th-century American male actors
21st-century American male actors
20th-century American comedians
21st-century American comedians